Buckhorn is the name of two unincorporated communities in the U.S. state of California:

Buckhorn, Amador County, California 
Buckhorn, Ventura County, California